Jonathon Heyward  is an American conductor. From 2016, he was assistant conductor of The Hallé, and music director of The Hallé Youth Orchestra. He has been chief conductor of the Nordwestdeutsche Philharmonie from 2021. On July 21, 2022, the Baltimore Symphony Orchestra announced that it had chosen Jonathon Heyward as its next music director. He is the first person of color to direct the Baltimore Symphony Orchestra.

Biography 
Heyward grew up in South Carolina, U.S., in a family with no exposure to classical music; his father lived in Haarlem, and his mother had parents from Russia and Yugoslavia. He was first trained as a cellist, studying with Timothy O'Malley, and chamber musician. His first public conducting opportunity took place in 2009 as part of Chamber Music Charleston's Mozart In The South Festival Youth Orchestra.  

Heyward studied conducting at the Boston Conservatory with Andrew Altenbach, and then was assistant conductor for both the conservatory's opera department and the Boston Opera Collaborative, where he worked on productions of Puccini's La Bohème, Mozart's Die Zauberflöte and Britten's The Rape of Lucretia. He completed post-graduate studies at the Royal Academy of Music in London with Sian Edwards in 2016.

Heyward was assistant conductor at the Hampstead Garden Opera Company from 2013. He won the 2015 International Besançon Competition for Young Conductors. When he left the Academy, he became assistant conductor of The Hallé, and music director of The Hallé Youth Orchestra. He has been chief conductor of the Nordwestdeutsche Philharmonie from 2021.

He conducted the National Youth Orchestra of Great Britain at the Royal Albert Hall in London at a concert of the 2021 Proms in a new work by Laura Jurd, Prokofiev's Second Violin Concerto with soloist Nicola Benedetti, and Beethoven's Third Symphony. The reviewer of The Guardian noted that he led "from memory – a fast and fearless performance of Beethoven’s Eroica Symphony, in which loud chords exploded, repeating like fireworks in the hall’s dome, and the quietest passages barely registered. It was exuberant, exhilarating stuff".

References

External links 
 
 
 Jonathon Heyward / Conductor / Chief Conductor of the Nordwestdeutsche Philharmonie (management) IMG Artists 2021

Year of birth missing (living people)
Living people
American male conductors (music)
21st-century American conductors (music)
Boston Conservatory at Berklee alumni